Gad Machnes may refer to:

 Gad Machnes (politician) (1893–1954), Israeli politician and businessman
 Gad Machnes (footballer) (born 1956), Israeli footballer